is a 1971 Japanese  anime feature film adaptation of Robert Louis Stevenson's 1883 novel Treasure Island. The film was produced by Toei Animation and released on the studio's 20th anniversary. It was licensed and distributed in English-language countries by Discotek Media.

Plot 
Jim, the young assistant of the keeper of the Admiral Bembo inn, and his mouse friend Gran (Rex in English) are one night asked by a rough, one-legged stranger for a room and to watch out for suspicious-looking characters. The latter, a band of black-cloaked assassins, soon arrive, and the man asks Jim to take care of the casket he's been carrying before engaging the intruders. Jim and Gran narrowly escape. After they return to the ransacked inn later, they open the casket in hopes of gaining some money as compensation for the damage. Inside they find a map to the treasure hidden by the infamous pirate Captain Flint.

Jim and Gran immediately set out with their steam-powered barrel boat - and the innkeeper's infant son Baboo as a stowaway - to recover the riches, but after a few days at sea they are captured by the pirate crew of Captain Silver and brought to Pirate Island, where both are sold to a slave merchant. Alerted by Gran's unchecked babbling, one of the crew, the monocled Baron, also steals the map from Jim in order to gain captaincy over his own ship by presenting it to the pirates' council.

In their holding cell, Jim and Gran encounter Kathy, Captain Flint's feisty and resolute granddaughter. They manage to escape the cell, and Jim recovers the map as the assembled captains of Pirate Island pour over it. Kathy, however, promptly steals it, and having no ship to reach the island, she accepts the Baron's offer of transportation, which is in turn instantly usurped by Silver. Silver and his crew try their best to steal the map back during the voyage, but Kathy's distrust and Jim's secret assistance foil the scheme repeatedly. After an attack by the pirate captain chairman, which they narrowly escape, Jim and Gran incapacitate Silver and his crew with their own sleeping potion.

Just before reaching the island, however, a storm rips the ship apart; Jim, Gran, Baboo, and the baby's self-appointed guardian, the walrus Otto, arrive just after Silver, his crew, and Kathy, now a prisoner of the pirates. In exchange for her friends' safety, Kathy offers to lead Silver to the exact location of the treasure. Silver, however, plans on double-crossing both Jim and his own crew to get the treasure for himself.

While Otto holds off his fellow pirates (who soon surrender after realizing that Silver wouldn't share with them anyway), Jim chases after Silver as he and his monkey helmsman, Spider, are climbing towards the top of an extinct volcano where the treasure is hidden. In the end Kathy sacrifices the final secret of recovering the treasure to save Jim's life, but it does no good to Silver; the mechanism he is told to trigger does not reveal the treasure immediately, but instead serves to drain the island volcano's crater lake. Silver and Spider are swept out into the sea, and the lake drains to reveal Flint's sunken ship, where Jim, Gran, Kathy and the reformed pirates find the treasure. The film ends with Jim and Kathy sailing away with Silver's ship, while the dethroned Silver and Spider chase after them on improvised log boats, quarreling all the while.

Voice Cast 
 Minori Matsushima as Jim
 Soko Tenchi as Kathy
 Asao Koike as Silver
 Kosei Tomita as Otto
 Hitoshi Takagi as Ossan
 Nishikibito Tamura as Spider
 Eiko Masuyama as Grandma
 Naozumi Yamamoto as Kankan
 Joji Yanami as Count
 Hidekatsu Shibata as The 1st Sailor
 Kunihiko Kitagawa as The 2nd Sailor
 Isamu Tanonaka as the 3rd Sailor
 Sachiko Chijimatsu as Pub
 Ichirō Nagai as Chairman of the council of pirates

Manga
Hayao Miyazaki created a manga adaptation as a promotional tie-in for the film. It was serialized in 13 installments, printed in color, in the Sunday edition of Tokyo Shimbun from January to March 1971.

References

External links 
  at Toei Animation (archived)
 
 

1971 anime films
Discotek Media
Works by Hayao Miyazaki
Toei Animation films
Toei Company films
Treasure Island films
Animated films based on novels